The Occupation of Gori was the military occupation of Gori and its surrounding areas by Russian military forces, which started on 13 August 2008 as part of the Russo-Georgian War; it ended with the withdrawal of Russian units from the city on 22 August 2008.

Background and initial airstrikes 
Gori is a major military installation and transportation hub in Georgia. 75 tanks and armored personnel carriers (a third of the Georgian military's arsenal) were assembled near Gori on 7 August.

Around 6:27 AM on 9 August 2008, Reuters reported that two Russian fighters had bombed a Georgian artillery position about 10 km north of Gori. On 9 August, a Russian air attack targeted military barracks in Gori. In the resulting explosion, besides the base, several apartment buildings and a school were also damaged. The Georgian government reported that 60 civilians were killed when bombs hit the apartment buildings. According to the Russian media, Russian aircraft dropped three bombs on an armament depot, and the façade of one of the adjacent 5-story apartment buildings suffered damage as a result of exploding ammunition from the depot. Russian aircraft had bombed at least five Georgian cities by 9 August.

Georgian abandonment 

Following its defeat in Tskhinvali, the Georgian Army regrouped at Gori. Georgian military entered the city on 10 August. On 10 August, BBC reported that people were leaving Gori because they feared of Russian advance towards the city. The United Nations High Commissioner for Refugees (UNHCR) and World Food Programme determined that about 80 percent of residents had left Gori as of 10 August. Russians began advancing towards Gori.

On 11 August 2008, the Georgian forces retreated from Gori. A senior Georgian security official, Kakha Lomaia, said that the troops were ordered to defend Tbilisi. Police sealed off the highway from Tbilisi, and did not allow any cars into the city. The Russian attacks were met with Georgian artillery firing towards South Ossetia, and at least six Georgian helicopters were reported to have also attacked targets in South Ossetia. A Times reporter described the Georgian withdrawal as "sudden and dramatic", saying that the "residents watched in horror" as their army abandoned their positions. Georgian tanks and armored personnel carries fled to Tbilisi. A tank exploded on the mountain road due to unspecified reasons, and an armored car pushing it out of the way also caught fire. Georgian infantry fled the city by any means available. Five soldiers escaped the city on one Quad bike. By late 11 August, Gori was deserted after most remaining residents and Georgian soldiers had fled.  Initial Georgian reports that Russian troops were in Gori, were later discounted by Georgia.

Georgian armed forces concentrated on holding Mtskheta,  from the capital Tbilisi. Deputy Defense Minister Batu Kutelia said that the defense line was being moved to Mtskheta.

The final air attacks 
On 12 August 2008, a Dutch television journalist Stan Storimans was killed and another journalist injured when Russian warplanes bombed the city. As a result of the explosion 7 people were killed, over 30 were injured. Georgian officials said Russian forces had been targeting the city's administrative buildings; the university of Gori and its post office were on fire after the bombings. Russia's deputy head of the General Staff, Colonel-General Anatoliy Nogovitsyn, denied that Russian forces had attacked the town. That day, a missile struck the Gori Military Hospital.

Human Rights Watch (HRW), an international rights group, accused Russia of deploying indiscriminately deadly cluster bombs in civilian areas.

Russian military official denied using cluster munitions. Numerous unexploded submunitions were subsequently found by local population in the Gori district and the HRW documented them.

Russian occupation 

Several hours after the ceasefire agreement was reached, a Russian tank battalion occupied parts of Gori. Rumors of a possible attack on Tbilisi circulated. Russian troops took control of Gori on 13 August 2008. Russian troops said they were removing military hardware and ammunition from an arms depot outside Gori. A Russian armored column left Gori, traveling along the main road to Tbilisi. Russian forces then halted their advance and camped out in a field about an hour's drive from Tbilisi.

In the morning of 14 August,vehicles from the Georgian police and military prepared to re-enter Gori. Russian major general Vyacheslav Borisov told Aleksandre Lomaia, secretary of Georgia's National Security Council, that the residents of Gori were not disturbed by the Russians' presence. Later, Russian forces allowed Georgian police to return. Vyacheslav Borisov claimed that the city of Gori was controlled jointly by Georgian Police and Russian troops. He further said that Russian troops would start leaving Gori in two days. But joint patrols soon broke down because of apparent discord among personnel and the city returned to full Russian control. More than 30 police officers returned to a Georgian post outside the city.

The parts of Georgia’s army, which had manned a narrow front in the immediate vicinity down the road, maintained their positions. The Russian move coincided with the U.S. Secretary of State Condoleezza Rice’s meeting with Georgian president Saakashvili on 15 August.

"Now Ossetians are running around and killing poor Georgians in their enclaves," said Major-General Vyacheslav Borisov on 14 August. A Russian lieutenant said: "We have to be honest. The Ossetians are marauding." Answering a journalist's question, a Russian lieutenant colonel said: "We're not a police force, we're a military force. [...] It's not our job to do police work." The New York Times noted, that "the Russian military might be making efforts in some places to stop the rampaging". On 17 August, BBC reported that humanitarian aid was being delivered to the city. The Russian commander in Gori said his troops were staying to prevent looting and would leave when Georgian police was ready to take over.

According to the Hague Convention, an occupying power has to insure public order and safety in the occupied areas. The Russian human rights group Memorial called the attacks by South Ossetian militia "pogroms".

Russian pullout of Gori 
The last Russian military formations left the city late on 22 August 2008, and Georgian law enforcement units moved into Gori shortly thereafter.

References 

Russo-Georgian War
Cluster bomb attacks
Gori
Gori
Gori
Military occupation
Gori, Georgia
August 2008 events in Asia
Russian war crimes in Georgia (country)
Gori